The Coast Tram is a public transport service connecting the cities and towns along the Belgian (West Flanders) coast between De Panne, near the French border, and Knokke-Heist, near the Dutch border. At  in length, it is currently the world's longest tram line in service as well as one of the few interurban tramways in the world to remain in operation.

History
What is now the coast line started out as part of the extensive Belgian Vicinal tramway, a network of interurban trams that once covered the entire nation. The first section of the coast line between Ostend and Nieuwpoort was opened in 1885. Although the original route was further inland than the modern one, only short parts of the original section in Ostend and Nieuwpoort centres are still in operation. On its creation, the line was managed by the NMVB (Nationale Maatschappij van Buurtspoorwegen), that operated an interurban tram system throughout Belgium. In 1991, the NMVB/SNCV was broken into two regional companies, one Walloon and the other Flemish, with the Flemish successor company, Vlaamse Vervoermaatschappij De Lijn taking responsibility for operation of the coastal tram.

Characteristics
 
The service makes 67 stops along the almost  line, with a tram running every 10 min during the peak summer months (every 20 min in the winter months), and it is used by over 15  million passengers per year. The service has been made more accessible by new low-floor centre sections to existing vehicles and (temporarily, from Ghent and Antwerp in the summer) a few new HermeLijn low-floor trams. In 2021, new CAF Urbos trams will come into service to replace the old trams. They are completely low-floor and longer than the old trams.

All trams, except those on loan from Ghent during the summer, are unidirectional and have to be turned on a loop in order to reverse direction. 

Notable features are the sea-view between Ostend and Middelkerke, the tracks through the dunes at De Haan, the fast speed, the two alternative routes that exist around both ends of the Leopoldkanaal locks, and the similar single track diversion around the inland end of the Boudewijnkanaal lock. 

The maximum speed is officially . This speed is common between the villages.

Gallery

See also
De Lijn
 List of town tramway systems in Belgium
NMVB / SNCV

References

External links 

  De Kusttram (Official site)
  De Lijn (Official site)
  Buurtspoorweg foto archief
  TRAMANIA Buurtspoorweg sponsoring
  UrbanRail.net page
 Cab Ride video of the entire line

Tram transport in Belgium
Metre gauge railways in Belgium
Public transport in Belgium
Interurban railways
600 V DC railway electrification
West Flanders
De Panne
Knokke-Heist